The chief of staff to the secretary of state is the coordinator of the supporting staff and primary aide to the United States secretary of state. Suzy George has served as chief of staff since the start of the Biden administration.

List of chiefs of staff to the secretary of state 
 Lawrence Wilkerson (2002 – January 2005)
 Brian Gunderson (January 28, 2005 – January 20, 2009)  
 Cheryl Mills (January 21, 2009 – February 1, 2013)
 David Wade (February 1, 2013 – March 8, 2015) 
 Jonathan Finer (March 8, 2015 – January 20, 2017)
 Margaret Peterlin (February 12, 2017 – March 31, 2018)
Suzy George (January 20, 2021 – present)

References

 
United States Department of State